Wards of London may refer to:

 Wards of the City of London
 List of electoral wards in Greater London